Schuylkill River National and State Heritage Area is a federally designated National Heritage Area in the valley of the Schuylkill River in southeastern Pennsylvania. The heritage area extends from Pottsville to Philadelphia through Schuylkill, Berks, Chester, Montgomery and Philadelphia counties. The national heritage area interprets and promotes the river's history during the American Revolution and the Industrial Revolution, as well as its natural environment and its recreational use.

Major historic sites within the national heritage area include Valley Forge National Historical Park, Independence National Historical Park, Hopewell Furnace National Historic Site and Cliveden. Natural areas within the heritage area include Hawk Mountain Sanctuary and John Heinz National Wildlife Refuge.

The heritage area is managed by the Schuylkill River Greenway Association. It was established by Public Law 106-278 in 2000.

References

External links

 Schuylkill River National and State Heritage Ara official website

 
2000 establishments in Pennsylvania
National Heritage Areas of the United States
Protected areas established in 2000
Protected areas of Schuylkill County, Pennsylvania
Protected areas of Berks County, Pennsylvania
Protected areas of Chester County, Pennsylvania
Protected areas of Montgomery County, Pennsylvania
Protected areas of Philadelphia